The Hanteng X5 is a compact crossover utility vehicle (CUV) produced by the Chinese manufacturer Hanteng Autos from 2016 until 2021.

Overview
The Hanteng X5 was introduced at the 2016 Guangzhou Auto Show. The Hanteng X5 compact CUV is Hanteng's second product and is positioned under the Hanteng X7 mid-size CUV.

A facelift for the  Hanteng X5 was first launched at the Guangzhou Auto Show in 2018, later relaunched as the 2020 model that meets the China-VI-b emissions standard.

Interior
The interior of the Hanteng X5 features a three-spoke steering wheel, a 8.8-inch floating multimedia LCD screen, solid wood trim and chrome-plated metal trim decorated door panels and center console.

Powertrain
The Hanteng X5 is powered by a 1.5 liter turbocharged four-cylinder petrol engine with 150hp and 215nm, mated to a five-speed manual transmission or a CVT.

Hanteng X5 EV
A pre-production electric version called the Hanteng X5 EV was revealed in 2018 previewing an electric version of the Hanteng X5.

References

External links

Official website

Hanteng X5
Compact sport utility vehicles
Front-wheel-drive vehicles
2010s cars
Cars introduced in 2016
Cars of China